Dichlorosilane, or DCS as it is commonly known, is a chemical compound with the formula H2SiCl2.  In its major use, it is mixed with ammonia (NH3) in LPCVD chambers to grow silicon nitride in semiconductor processing.  A higher concentration of DCS·NH3 (i.e. 16:1), usually results in lower stress nitride films.

History
Dichlorosilane was originally prepared by Stock and Somieski by the reaction of SiH4 with hydrogen chloride. Dichlorosilane reacts with water vapor to initially give monomeric prosiloxane::
Monomeric polymerizes rapidly upon condensation or in solution.

Reactions and formation
Most dichlorosilane results as a byproduct of the reaction of HCl with silicon, a reaction intended to give trichlorosilane.

Disproportionation of trichlorosilane is the preferred route.
2 SiHCl3  SiCl4 + SiH2Cl2

Hydrolysis
Stock and Somieski completed the hydrolysis of dichlorosilane by putting the solution of H2SiCl2 in benzene in brief contact with a large excess of water. A large-scale hydrolysis was done in a mixed ether/alkane solvent system at 0 °C, which gave a mixture of volatile and nonvolatile [H2SiO]n. Fischer and Kiegsmann attempted the hydrolysis of dichlorosilane in hexane, using NiCl2⋅6H2O as the water source, but the system failed. They did, however, complete the hydrolysis using dilute Et2O/CCl4 at -10 °C. The purpose of completing the hydrolysis of dichlorosilane is to collect the concentrated hydrolysis products, distill the solution, and retrieve a solution of [H2SiO]n oligomers in dichloromethane. These methods were used to obtain cyclic polysiloxanes.

Another purpose for hydrolyzing dichlorosilane is to obtain linear polysiloxanes, and can be done by many different complex methods. The hydrolysis of dichlorosilane in diethyl ether, dichloromethane, or pentane gives cyclic and linear polysiloxanes.

Decomposition 
Su and Schlegal studied the decomposition of dichlorosilane using transition state theory (TST) using calculations at the G2 level. Wittbrodt and Schlegel worked with these calculations and improved them using the QCISD(T) method. The primary decomposition products were determined by this method to be SiCl2 and SiClH.

Ultrapurification 
Dichlorosilane must be ultrapurified and concentrated in order to be used for the manufacturing of semiconducting epitaxial silicon layers, which are used for microelectronics. The buildup of the silicon layers produces thick epitaxial layers, which creates a strong structure.

Advantage of use
Dichlorosilane is used as a starting material for semiconducting silicon layers found in microelectronics. It is used because it decomposes at a lower temperature and has a higher growth rate of silicon crystals.

Safety hazards
It is a chemically active gas, which will readily hydrolyze and self ignite in air. Dichlorosilane is also very toxic, and preventative measures must be used for any experiment involving the use of the chemical. Safety hazards also includes skin and eye irritation and inhalation.

References

External links
 Safety data sheet for dichlorosilane from Praxair®

Chlorosilanes
Inorganic silicon compounds